Alberto Ubaldo Triulzi Orozco  (6 January 1928 – 9 September 1968)  was an Argentine track and field athlete who specialised in hurdling and sprinting events. He competed in the 1948 Summer Olympics in the 110 m hurdles, where he finished fourth.| Wife  Carmen Mora de Triulzi
| Children  Alberto Victonico Triulzi Mora, Carmen Elena Triulzi Mora, Bettina Triulzi Mora

Born in Buenos Aires, he was a three-time continental champion at the South American Championships in Athletics, winning a 200 metres/110 metres hurdles double in 1947 before taking a gold and bronze at the 1949 event. He broke the world junior record for the 110 m hurdles in his early career.

He was ranked eighth in a 1999 Confederación Argentina de Atletismo poll for the male Argentine athlete of the century.

References

External links

Brinkster Track and Field profile

1928 births
1968 deaths
Argentine male sprinters
Argentine male hurdlers
Olympic athletes of Argentina
Athletes (track and field) at the 1948 Summer Olympics
Athletes from Buenos Aires